Go for Your Life may refer to:

 Go for Your Life (album), a 1985 album by Mountain
 Go for Your Life (fitness program), a program set up by the Victorian Government